The Sky Through the Trees is a 1958 Yugoslav war film directed by Stole Janković. It was entered into the 1st Moscow International Film Festival.

Cast
 Branko Pleša as a wounded man on a stretcher (I)
 Predrag Laković as a wounded man on a stretcher (II)
 Ljuba Kovačević as commander Zekavica
 Jozo Laurenčić as a wounded man lying on his stomach
 Nikola Popovic as Mitar - tifusar
 Salko Repak as a blind old man
 Miroslav Petrović as Faust
 Stole Aranđelović as Tifusar
 Nada Škrinjar as boy's mother, a wounded woman on a stretcher
 Vera Čukić as nurse Branka
 Dragan Šaković as Simo

References

External links
 

1958 films
1958 war films
Serbo-Croatian-language films
Serbian black-and-white films
Yugoslav black-and-white films
Serbian war films
Yugoslav war films
Films set in Yugoslavia
Films shot in Serbia
Yugoslav World War II films
Serbian World War II films